Gjurakoc is a village in the municipality of Istog, Kosovo. It is located south of Istog.

Notes

References

Villages in Istog